G-Zen is a vegan fine-dining restaurant in Branford, Connecticut.

History
The restaurant was established in 2011. Chef-owners Ami Beach and Mark Shadle source ingredients from their own farm for the menu, which changes daily.

Reception

"Upscale spiritual retreat center", says Stephanie Lyness of The New York Times in 2012.

See also
List of vegetarian restaurants

References

Vegan restaurants in the United States
2011 establishments in Connecticut
Restaurants established in 2011
Fine dining